The 2012–13 Melbourne Renegades season was the second in the club's history. Coached by Simon Helmot and captained by Aaron Finch, they competed in the BBL's 2012–13 season.

Summary
The 2012–13 Big Bash League season saw the Renegades release several star players including the previous seasons captain, Andrew McDonald. However the recruitment of consistent players such as Ben Rohrer and Peter Nevill and cricket legend Muttiah Muralitharan, saw the season being the Renegades most successful season to date, finishing on top of the ladder, only losing to the Perth Scorchers in the regular season. Aaron Finch also became the first Renegades player to score a century after scoring 111 from 65 balls against the Melbourne Stars. Finch also won The Renegades were knocked out by the Brisbane Heat in the semi-finals, losing by 15 runs.

Fixtures

Regular season

Knockout stage

Ladder

Ladder progress

Squad information
The current squad of the Melbourne Renegades for the 2012–13 Big Bash League season.

Season statistics

Home attendance

References

External links
 Official website of the Melbourne Renegades
 Official website of the Big Bash League

Melbourne Renegades seasons